The Focke-Wulf Fw 56 Stösser (German : goshawk) was a single-engine, parasol monoplane advanced trainer, built in the 1930s in Germany.

Development
The Fw 56 was developed, in accordance with a request by the Reich Air Ministry for an advanced fighter trainer, by Kurt Tank, chief engineer with Focke-Wulf. It was also considered for possible use as a home defence fighter.

The first prototype flew for the first time in November 1933. A second prototype had some modifications made to the fuselage, and metal rather than wooden wings for flight testing. The third prototype, which flew in February 1934, reverted to the wooden wing and satisfied the technical designers.

After comparison flights in 1935 against its two competitors - the Arado Ar 76 and the Heinkel He 74 - the Air Ministry ordered production to begin. About 1,000 aircraft were built, mostly used by Germany, though numbers were used by Austria and Hungary. A few were sold for private use, for instance to Gerd Achgelis, who later founded the helicopter company Focke-Achgelis with Henrich Focke.

Ernst Udet, an advocate of the use of dive bombers, demonstrated the second prototype - Fw 56 V2 - in this role, leading to Luftwaffe development of dive bombers.

Design
The Fw 56 was a parasol-wing monoplane aircraft with a fuselage of steel tube construction, clad in metal at the front, and canvas elsewhere. The wing was of wood, covered mostly in plywood, while the trailing edge was fabric-covered. The fixed conventional undercarriage consisted of two cantilever main legs and a tailskid. The aircraft was powered by an air-cooled Argus inline engine and intended as a single-seat advanced trainer for the fledgling pilot trainee to transition to from the Bucher primary trainer. In addition, for its secondary role as an emergency fighter as well as aiding aspiring fighter pilot trainees in conversion, it was fitted with 2 fixed cowl-mounted 7.9mm MG17 machine guns as well as a removable ventral rack for 3 10kg bombs (inert practice bombs or, in the event, light antipersonnel fragmentation bombs)

The Fw 56 was highly popular with pilots, due to its aerobatic capabilities and fine handling.

Variants
 Fw 56a : First prototype.
 Fw 56 V2 : Second prototype.
 Fw 56 V3 : Third prototype.
 Fw 56A-0 : Three preproduction aircraft.
 Fw 56A-1 : Single-seat advanced trainer. Main production version.

Operators
 
 Austrian Air Force (1927-1938)

 Bolivian Air Force (1936 ex D-IBAE)

 Bulgarian Air Force

 Luftwaffe

Royal Hungarian Air Force
 
Royal Netherlands Air Force

Royal Romanian Air Force

Spanish Republican Air Force, one of the few German-made planes in the loyalist air force.

Spanish Air Force

Specifications (Fw 56A-1)

See also

References

External links

 https://web.archive.org/web/20080401114708/http://aviationtrivia.info/Focke-Wulf-FW-56-Stosser.php
 http://www.warbirdsresourcegroup.org/LRG/fw56.html
 https://web.archive.org/web/20061016135052/http://www.luftfahrtmuseum.com/htmi/itf/fw56.htm

Fw 056
Single-engined tractor aircraft
Parasol-wing aircraft
1930s German military trainer aircraft
Aircraft first flown in 1933